Juliano Mer-Khamis (born Juliano Khamis; 29 May 19584 April 2011) was an Israeli/Palestinian actor, director, filmmaker, and political activist of Jewish and Palestinian Eastern Orthodox Christian parentage. On 4 April 2011, he was assassinated by a masked gunman in the Palestinian city of Jenin, where he had established The Freedom Theatre.

Biography
Juliano Khamis (later Mer-Khamis) was born in Nazareth, the son of Arna Mer-Khamis, a former Palmach combatant who had turned communist and joined the Maki on experiencing disenchantment with Zionism after having participated in operations to drive Bedouin inhabitants out of parts of the Negev, and Saliba Khamis, an Israeli Arab of Eastern Orthodox Palestinian Christian descent who was an intellectual as well as one of the leaders of the Israeli Communist Party in the 1950s. He was called Sputnik Hamis at birth. He had two brothers, Spartacus and Abir. His maternal grandfather was Gideon Mer, a scientist who pioneered the study of malaria during the British Mandate. His father abandoned their household when he was 10 years old. He attended school in Haifa. His cousin is Palestinian hip-hop singer Shadia Mansour.

Mer-Khamis' first marriage was to Mishmesh Uri, with whom he had a daughter. At the time of his death, Mer-Khamis was married to Jenny Nyman, a Finnish woman who did administrative and fundraising work for the Jenin theater. They had three sons. Khamis saw the birth of one son, but was killed while his wife was pregnant with their twins. She gave birth to the twins a month after his death, and moved to Haifa to raise them.

Service in the IDF
Mer-Khamas served in the Israeli Defense Forces as a combat soldier in the Paratroopers Brigade. He was a volunteer, since the army did not send him his draft papers, and he was eager to fight for his country. He adopted his maternal surname, Mer, dropping the surname Khamis which identified him as an Arab and had caused him problems among fellow Jews. While his mother was supportive of his enlistment, his father opposed it on grounds that the IDF was a fascist institution. Mer-Khamas didn't disagree, but countered that, 'I must see with my own eyes that they are really fascist'. He was eventually stationed in Jenin. According to him, one of his tasks was to carry a weapons bag and if someone was killed by accident, a weapon would be left on the corpse. Mer-Khamis said that while his squad was engaged in night-time firing practice they shot a shoulder missile at a donkey, accidentally killing a young girl seated on it. Mer-Khamis said that a load of explosives were left on the donkey to cover up the incident. He recalls beating up Palestinian protestors after they refused to disperse. When asked why, he recalled: "I wanted to be on one side. I wanted to be with somebody. Because I felt like nobody."

At one point he refused to obey his commanding officer's order to frisk an elderly man, punching the former instead, and spent several months in prison. His release was won by the direct intervention of Isser Harel, who was his mother's cousin.

Theatre interest, travel and return
On his release from the stockade, he enrolled in acting school, and discovered his abilities in that field. He made an appearance in The Little Drummer Girl, a film which deals with Palestinian terrorism.
In 1987 he spent a year in the Philippines, consuming hallucinogenic mushrooms and talking to monkeys. It was there that he felt, according to a later declaration, that he had shaken off all identities. On his return, he lived as a beachcomber in Tel Aviv. He protested against Israel's response to the First Intifada by stripping himself and walking about covered in fake blood. Mishmish Or, an Israeli Jew of Turkish paternal and Egyptian maternal descent, picked him up off the sidewalks and gave him shelter. The two would eventually have a daughter together, Milay. In the meantime his mother Arna set up a children's center to teach over 1500 children in the Jenin camp and asked her son to join her there to teach drama therapy.

When the Al-Aqsa Intifada broke out, two of his former students, Yusuf Sweitat and Nidal al-Jabali, became suicide bombers in October 2001 at Hadera. Two weeks earlier, a girl whom Sweitat had salvaged from a school classroom that had just been bombed by the IDF died as he carried her to the hospital. Hearing the news, Mer-Khamis returned to Jenin a month after the Battle of Jenin had begun. His host was a former student, Ala’a Sabbagh, then aged 22, leader of Jenin's Al-Aqsa Martyrs Brigade, and he spent several months on patrol with men on Israel's hit list, and in hideouts, with Sabbagh and Zakaria Zubeidi, whose mother had been killed in April 2002 by an Israeli sniper who perhaps mistook her for her son Tata, who was also subsequently shot dead an hour later. He made a film on the period, Arna's Children, released in 2004.

Outside of the theater he devoted himself to allaying everyday problems: driving pregnant women to Israeli hospitals, or Jenin's children to Haifa's beaches, or providing medicines and food.

In a 2009 interview with Israel Army Radio, Mer-Khamis said of his background: "I am 100 percent Palestinian and 100 percent Jewish."

Mer-Khamis was married to Jenny Nyman, a Finnish activist he met in Haifa in May 2006. They had a son, Jay, and were expecting the birth of twins at the time of his death.

The theater he founded thrives, under the general management of Swedish-Israeli Jonathan Stanczyk, with actor Nabil al-Raee as artistic director.

Film and acting career
Mer-Khamis's first film, The Little Drummer Girl, was an American thriller from 1984 directed by George Roy Hill and starring Diane Keaton, which dealt with the Israeli-Arab conflict. He starred in Avi Nesher's film, Za'am V'Tehilah (1985). Later he appeared in such Israeli films as 51 Bar (1985), Wedding in Galilee (1987), Tel Aviv Stories (1992), Zohar (1993), Under the Domim Tree (1994), and Overture 1812 (1997). He appeared in several films by Amos Gitai: Kedma, Esther (1986) and Kippur (2000).

In 2002, Mer-Khamis was nominated for the Ophir Award for Best Actor for his role in Kedma. One of the last films in which he appeared was the Palestinian film Salt of this Sea (2008), which was nominated for an Academy Award for Best Foreign Language Film.

He performed on stage with Beit Lessin Theater and Habima Theatre. In 2003, he produced and directed his first documentary film, Arna's Children, together with Danniel Danniel. The film is about his mother's work to establish a children's theatre group in Jenin during the 1980s.

In 2011 he joined the faculty of the Academy of Performing Arts, Tel Aviv, where he taught acting until his assassination.

In 2006, following a wave of international support which was followed by his film, Mer-Khamis opened a community theater for children and adults in Jenin, called The Freedom Theatre.

The Freedom Theatre

In 2006, Mer-Khamis established The Freedom Theatre along with Zakaria Zubeidi, a former military leader of the Jenin Al-Aqsa Martyrs' Brigades, Jonatan Stanczak, a Swedish-Israeli activist, and Dror Feiler, a Swedish-Israeli artist. The Freedom Theatre is a community theatre that provides opportunities for the children and youth of the Jenin Refugee Camp by developing skills, self-knowledge and confidence and using the creative process as a model for social change.

Assassination
Mer-Khamis was shot by masked gunmen while leaving the theater he had founded in Jenin. He had just started to drive away in his Citroën, with his baby son Jay on his lap, when a masked gunman emerged from a nearby alley and asked him to stop. The babysitter with them advised him to drive on, but he stopped, and was shot five times. He was rushed to the Jenin Hospital, where he was pronounced dead after his arrival. Palestinian National Authority Prime Minister Salam Fayyad condemned the killing, saying that "We cannot stand silent in the face of this ugly crime, it constitutes a grave violation that goes beyond all principles and human values and it contravenes with the customs and ethics of co-existence."

In an interview in 2008, Mer-Khamis had foreseen the circumstances of his murder, predicting jokingly that he would be killed by a "fucked-up Palestinian" for "corrupting the youth of Islam". After being identified by the babysitter in three separate lineups, one Mujahed Qaniri, from Jenin's refugee camp, was charged by Palestinian police with the murder. On 19 April 2011, Adnan Dameery, spokesperson for the Palestinian Security Forces, reported DNA tests had exonerated the only detained suspect and that the murderer was still at large.

Filmography

Television and video

References

External links

 
 The Murder of an Actor/Activist  – slideshow by Life magazine

1958 births
2011 deaths
Deaths by firearm in the West Bank
People from Nazareth
Israeli activists
Arab-Israeli film directors
Israeli film directors
Israeli male stage actors
Israeli male film actors
Israeli Arab Jews
Israeli people of Lithuanian-Jewish descent
Israeli murder victims
People murdered in the Palestinian territories
Palestinian male film actors
Israeli male television actors
Jews in the State of Palestine
Palestinian male stage actors
Palestinian male actors